Miroslav Gjokikj (or romanized as Đokić, Djokic, Ǵokić, Gjokić) (Macedonian: Mиpocлaв Ѓoкиќ ; born 17 January 1973) is a retired Macedonian international football player.

International career
He made his senior debut for Macedonia in a November 1996 friendly match away against Malat and has earned a total of eight caps, scoring two goals. His final international was an April 2002 friendly against Finland.

References

External links

Profile at Macedonian Federation website.

1973 births
Living people
Macedonian footballers
FK Sileks players
Hapoel Petah Tikva F.C. players
NK Istra players
FK Pobeda players
FK Madžari Solidarnost players
FK Sloga Jugomagnat players
Macedonian First Football League players
Israeli Premier League players
Croatian Football League players
Macedonian expatriate footballers
North Macedonia international footballers
Expatriate footballers in Israel
Expatriate footballers in Croatia
Macedonian expatriate sportspeople in Israel
Macedonian expatriate sportspeople in Croatia
Macedonian people of Serbian descent
Association football forwards